Chad Culp (born February 5, 1982 in Arthur, Ontario) is an assistant coach for the Halifax Thunderbirds of the National Lacrosse League (NLL) and former professional Canadian lacrosse player. He has played for the Buffalo Bandits, Minnesota Swarm New England Black Wolves, Colorado Mammoth, Arizona Sting, and New York Saints.

Chad got married in 2010 in Barrie. He and his wife have a daughter and a son.

Statistics

NLL

References

1982 births
Living people
Arizona Sting players
Buffalo Bandits players
Canadian lacrosse players
Colorado Mammoth players
Halifax Thunderbirds coaches
Minnesota Swarm players
New York Saints players
New England Black Wolves players
Lacrosse people from Ontario